Aadigere  is a village in the southern state of Karnataka, India. It is located in the Kadur taluk of Chikkamagaluru district in Karnataka.

See also
 Chikmagalur
 Districts of Karnataka

References

External links
 Official Chikmagalur Website showing Aadigere Village

Villages in Chikkamagaluru district